Masumabad (also Romanized as Ma‘şūmābād; also known as Manşūrābād) is a village in Rudbal Rural District, in the Central District of Marvdasht County, Fars Province, Iran. At the 2006 census, its population was 390, in 106 families.

References 

Populated places in Marvdasht County